Benjamin Waller (1 October 1716 – 1 May 1786) was descended from a Virginia family established in the state since the 17th century. He was born in King William County, Virginia, the son of Col. John and Dorothy (King) Waller, and was trained as a lawyer utilizing the legal library of Sir John Randolph. Benjamin Waller was a clerk of the general court for a number of years and, in 1777, he was named presiding judge of the court of admiralty in Williamsburg, Virginia. Subsequently, he served as a judge on the first Court of Appeals where he remained until 1785 when the court moved to Richmond, Virginia.

He was an eminent lawyer of Colonial times and held many important offices under the crown.  His name is on the list of the Committee of Safety for the city of Williamsburg Dec. 1774 (Forces Archives.) He was Judge of the Court of Admiralty and in a list of the Judges of the Supreme court of Virginia 1778 (WMQ July 1898). Also:  King's attorney of Gloucester (1738); Clerk of James City county (1739; 1742); clerk of "The Court of Oyer and Terminer" (1739); Clerk of the "Committees of Propositions and Grievances, and Privileges, and Elections" (1743); all under George II of Great Britain.  He served on the Supreme Court of Virginia 1779–1785.

As clerk of courts, it fell to Benjamin Waller to read the United States Declaration of Independence from the Williamsburg courthouse steps on July 25, 1776. Waller also served as mentor and teacher of law to George Wythe.

His grandson, Littleton Waller Tazewell, was a U.S. Representative, U.S. Senator from and governor of Virginia. Benjamin Waller's family had emigrated from Newport Pagnell, Buckinghamshire, England, the branch of a family long seated at Beaconsfield and previously at Groombridge Place, Kent, England. John Waller Esquire was one of the signators to the Second Charter of Virginia in 1609. Author Alex Haley sketched out the family's English origins in his book Roots: The Saga of an American Family. Williamsburg's Waller Street is named for Benjamin Waller and his family.

Biography 
He married Martha Hall in 1746 and they had 10 children. Martha "tended to the household overseeing the children and directing the work of their several slaves. One of his grandsons, William Waller, married the daughter of U.S. President John Tyler and lived in Benjamin Waller's house in Williamsburg".

References

External links
 Dr. Robert P. Waller House (grandson of Benjamin Waller), Colonial Williamsburg Digital Library
 George Washington to Benjamin Waller, April 2, 1760, George Washington's Mount Vernon Estate & Gardens

1716 births
1786 deaths
18th-century American Episcopalians
American legal scholars
American slave owners
British North American Anglicans
Clerks
College of William & Mary alumni
County King's attorneys in Virginia
House of Burgesses members
People from King William County, Virginia
Politicians from Williamsburg, Virginia
People of Virginia in the American Revolution
Virginia colonial people
Virginia lawyers
Virginia state court judges
Justices of the Supreme Court of Virginia
18th-century American politicians